Puerto Rico Highway 113 (PR-113) is a rural road that travels from Isabela, Puerto Rico to Quebradillas. It begins at downtown Isabela and ends at its intersection with PR-119 near Guajataca Lake.

Major intersections

See also

 List of highways numbered 113

References

External links
 

113